The Trust Hospital also known as The Trust Hospital Company Limited is a Ghanaian healthcare facility that used to provide healthcare services to the staff of SSNIT and their dependants. They later got upgraded into a full-fledge hospital to extend its services to the general public. The Trust Hospital engages in a number of health screening activities including Breast Cancer Awareness campaigns for the general public through partnership with other private organizations.

History
The Trust Hospital was established in 1992 as a not-for-profit healthcare facility for only SSNIT staff and they later became a full-fledge hospital and extended its services to the public.

The Trust Hospital was incorporated in November 2010 as The Trust Hospital Company Limited in Ghana. The Trust Hospital Company Limited has three Hospitals- The Trust Hospital, The Trust Specialist Hospital and the Trust Mother and Child Hospital and six Satellite Clinics.

The Trust Hospital appointed Dr. Mrs. Juliana Oye Ameh as its first chief executive officer, since the hospital was broken off from the mother company SSNIT in January 2013.

Locations

Hospitals
The Trust Hospital Company Limited has three hospitals;
The Trust Hospital - Osu
The Trust Specialist Hospital - Osu 
The Trust Mother and Child Hospital - Osu

Clinics
The Trust Clinics are community-based clinics with ultra-modern facilities and experienced health professionals. These clinics are National Health Insurance Scheme (NHIS) accredited and clients can assess healthcare by using the NHIS card.
The Trust Clinic - Tema 	
The Trust Clinic - Sakumono	
The Trust Clinic - Adenta
The Trust Clinic - Dome
The Trust Clinic – Pension House
The Trust Clinic – Dansoman

Facilities
The Trust Hospital Company Limited, in 2014 inaugurated a maternal and infant clinic at Osu in Accra called “Mother and Child Hospital,” which assists in providing quality and safe medical care to women and children. The hospital has a colposcope to help with the treatment of cervical cancer in Ghana. The colposcope is a machine that can visualise the cervix and determine changes that are likely to pose a threat to the cervix.

The Trust Hospital in 2018 went digital as they introduced the Electronic Medical Record system which serves as a network system that connects all their three hospitals and six clinics across the country. During the outbreak of COVID-19 they introduced a new service called The Trust Hospital Telemedicine Service which was to allow them serve their clients at home or in the office during the pandemic.

External links
Official Website

References 

Hospitals in Ghana
Greater Accra Region
Buildings and structures in Accra